Arthur Gray McCoy   (1864–1904) was a Major League Baseball player. He played in two games for the   Washington Nationals of the National League on July 8 and July 9, 1889. He played second base and failed to get a hit in six at-bats.

External links

1864 births
1904 deaths
19th-century baseball players
Baseball players from Pennsylvania
Hazleton Pugilists players
Harrisburg Senators players
Lewiston Independents players
Major League Baseball second basemen
Washington Nationals (1886–1889) players